Midsayap, officially the Municipality of Midsayap (Maguindanaon: Inged nu Midsayap, Jawi: ايڠايد نو ميدسايڤ; Iranun: Inged a Midsayap, ايڠايد ا ميدسايڤ; ;), is a 1st class municipality in the Province of Cotabato, Philippines. According to the 2020 census, it has a population of 117,365 people.

History
Midsayap was derived from a Maguindanao term which means (Mid) Center and (Sayap) Straw Hat. Midsayap means a straw hat at the center – just like a hill centrally located at the Municipality which slopes through the plains in a shape of a hat.  Other version relates that Midsayap came from a Maguindanao term which means "person wearing a straw hat". From 1912 to 1926, Midsayap was then a district of Dulawan and Pikit. Originally, Midsayap was inhabited by Muslims from the descendants of Sultan Ali Bayao from the lineage of Sultan Dipatuan Kudarat I. The seat of their sultanate was established at Libungan Torreta (now part of Pigcawayan).

In 1927, a Philippine Constabulary (PC) Commander assigned in the area, Ist Lt. Catalino Javier, initiated the development of some portions of the municipality. Seeing the natural bounty of the area, he invited settlers from Luzon and Visayas to migrate in the area. The first wave of settlers who dared develop the wilderness was the late Antonio Labasan from Zambales. Among his companions were 23 interrelated families, the Rosete, Almazan, Dumlaos, Flautas, Fernandezes, QuiÑones,Fermils, Fantones and Documos who settled at Sitio Salunayan and Bual . Visayan settlers from Pikit also came to settle at Bual - the place of Datu Guiambangan Dilangalen. The Visayan migrants were headed by Gregorio Bingil, Julio Anito and Tomas Cantoy.
The idea of making Midsayap as a separate political district from the mother municipalities of Dulawan and Pikit was envisioned in 1930 by a group of Christian PC enlisted men who were assigned at Camp Ward. Their efforts, through the support of the deputy governor and military governor was realized in 1936.

Pursuant to Executive Order No. 66 dated November 25, 1936, Midsayap was created as a separate municipality. On January 1, 1937, it was inaugurated with Lorenzo Gonzales as its first appointed municipal mayor. In 1939, Juan Jaranilla became the first elected mayor of the municipality and served in that position until 1941.

Midsayap started with 71 barangays. Later, it was trimmed down to 42 when Libungan was separated from Midsayap in 1936. At present, Midsayap has 57 barangays. Population settlements were concentrated on the barangays of Sinawingan, Salunayan, Bual, Kapayawi, Barongis, Kimagango, Kiwanan, Katingawan, Ulamian, Baguer, Kapinpilan, Olandang, San Mateo, and Baliki. The following years showed the growth of the newly formed town. Gradually, new towns has been created. These are Pigcawayan (Pigkawayan), Libungan, Alamada, and lastly in 1982, Aleosan.

Before the creation of the Bangsamoro Special Geographic Area in 2019, Midsayap was the most populous settlement in the province of North Cotabato. With the creation of the aforementioned area, several of its barangays were carved out from the municipality and were thus duly turned over to the Bangsamoro government, creating special governance clusters in their place, thus its area of jurisdiction as well as its population and number of barangays was reduced to its current status. While still a large town despite the reduction, it is one of the oldest settlements of migrants from Luzon and the Visayas, thereby giving its reputation as the highly heterogeneous society in this once Muslim-dominated place of Mindanaon.

Geography
Midsayap is geographically located at the Southwestern portion of North Cotabato Province. It is bounded on the north by the Municipality of Libungan; on the south by the Rio Grande de Mindanao; on the east by the municipalities of Aleosan and Pikit; and on the west by the Municipality of Kabuntalan.

Midsayap has a total land area of 29,042 hectares comprising 57 barangays which is 5.03% of the total land area of Cotabato province. Some of the barangays (Southern and Western part) are along the big bodies of water, thus making it accessible by water transportation. However, due to the construction of a concrete bridge at Dulawan towards the province of Sultan Kudarat and some municipalities of Maguindanao Province, land transportation is now feasible. The town is traversed by the Davao-Cotabato and the Midsayap-Makar national highways (General Santos).

Barangays
It is politically subdivided into 57 barangays.

Note

Climate

The province is situated between 5 and 8 degrees latitude thus Midsayap and all areas within its jurisdiction is less affected by typhoon. The municipality falls under the fourth type of climate which is characterized by more or less even distribution of rainfall throughout the year.

Land capability

The highest portion of municipal land area –  – is classified as good land. These are the land centrally located in the municipality. These lands are nearly level lands and can be cultivate safely. However, protection from occasional overflow is required. The 10,651.2869 hectares which are Hydrosol type are wetlands and are suitable for fishpond or recreation purposes. Most of these lands are along the Rio Grande de Mindanao. The Center type of land are moderately good land, moderately sloping so that cultivation requires carefully planned erosion control measures. These lands are on the Northeastern barangays and a portion of Nabalawag and Kadingilan with an area of 8,010.0 hectares.

Soil type

There are four (4) types of soil in this municipality. These are: Kabacan Clay, Kudarangan Clay, San Manuel Silty Clay Loam and Hydrosol. Kabacan Clay Loam is about 12,397.500 hectares or 37.52% of the municipal land area.

These are the soils at the central portion or at the heart of the municipality. Kudarangan Clay Loam is found in slightly rolling to hilly terrain or at the north-eastern barangays. This soil type occupies the 24.24 percent of the municipal area or 8,010.00 hectares. San Manuel Silty Clay Loam is located at barangays Upper Labas, Nalin and portions of barangay Villarica. This occupies an area of 1,980 hectares. Hydrosol type has an area of 10,651.2869 hectares or 33.24 percent of the municipal area.

Slope

Of the total land area of the municipality, 73.79 percent or 24,376.2869 hectares has a slope of 0–3 percent. These areas are located at the western and southern part of the municipality. These are mostly the irrigable rice lands.

The Northeastern barangays, a portion of Central Bulanan are hilly with slopes with 3-8% with a total area of 6,525.0 hectares. Highest slopes of 8–18% percent are situated at the boundary of barangays Nabalawag and Kadingilan and a portion of Central Bulanan. This has a total land area of 2,137.5 hectares.

Topography
Midsayap is characterized as plain to hilly terrain. Gently rolling to hilly areas are located on the Northeastern portion specifically at barangays - Kiwanan, Kimagango, Anonang, Malamote, Upper Bulanan and Milaya. A portion of Kadingilan and Nabalawag has a hilly portion at their boundaries. All barangays on the western portion which is cut by the  National Highway from Poblacion to Dulawan is plain and is presently planted with irrigated rice and other crops. The southernmost barangays are marshy being located along the Rio Grande de Mindanao.

Demographics

The 2010 Census of Population and Housing of the Philippine Statistics Authority recorded the population of Midsayap at 134,170. It is the most populous among the municipalities of the province.

Growing at the pace of 1.92 percent for the past five years, the town is expected to double its population within 36 years.

Midsayap is populated mainly by Maguindanaos and as well as multi-cultural mix of peoples from the influx of migrants from Luzon and the Visayas, drawn to Mindanao's reputation as a promising haven for settlers.

Languages
Cebuano is the widely spoken language. It is also common for people speaking different languages such as Iranun, Hiligaynon, Ilocano,  Manobo, Waray, among others.

Economy

Characterized to have a clay type of soil that is best suited for agricultural use, most (42.03 percent) of the town's land area are devoted to agricultural production. The lowland areas were planted with rice and other seasonal crops while the upland areas were planted with permanent crops. Agricultural products of the town include rice, corn, mango, coffee, coconut, banana, vegetables and root crops.

Aside from the thriving agriculture industry, Midsayap also boasts of its other industries such as cut flowers and ornamental plants, livestock and poultry, furnitures and decorative crafts and telecommunications. It is also a potential area for putting up other industries such as fruit and meat processing as well as oil palm plantation and processing.

Strategically located, Midsayap serves as a major commercial and trading center of the province where farmers from neighboring municipalities bring their agricultural products to be sold/traded.Recently, Midsayap evolved into an industrial place in the first district of North Cotabato especially in PPALMA area (Pigcawayan, Pikit, Alamada, Libungan, Midsayap, Aleosan) and vying to be the 2nd-tier City in the province. The prolific growth of business establishments made the town as a unique Municipality since a lot of city-based companies has already entered the town. The town is also adjudged as the 5th most competitive Municipality in the Philippines and Rank 1 in entire Mindanao in the year 2016.

Cotabato City-Kidapawan City (CK) with Midsayap Agri-industrial and Eco Tourism Corridor

Is an Agri-industrial and Eco Tourism Corridor projected by the NEDA region 12, the primary growth node in this corridor is Cotabato City with Kidapawan City and Midsayap as intermediate urban centers.

Cotabato City as the primary urban center in this corridor, serves as the institutional, financial and service center, also the center of public health with the existence of the Cotabato Regional and Medical Center, and the de facto capital of BARMM. The city is a special economic zone is expected to diversify its economic base and will facilitate the creation of more investment and job opportunities.

Cotabato Province ranks first in the region in rice and rubber production, second in corn and produces organic coco sugar and delicious tropical fruits. It hosts processing plants for palm oil, sugar cane and rubber. The Mount Apo Geothermal Power plant in Kidapawan City generates 52 megawatts.

Tourism

Annually, the townsfolk of Midsayap prepares for its colorful street dancing and parade competition popularly known as the "Halad sa Santo Niño Festival" as part of its grand fiesta celebration, which is held every third Sunday of January. The Halad Festival is celebrated in honor of the town's patron saint Señor Santo Niño.

Groups from various towns in Cotabato Province as well as neighboring towns of the Maguindanao Province troop annually to Midsayap to participate in the much celebrated contest, which is recognized by the Department of Tourism as a major festival.

This widely popular event started in 1988 through the efforts of REACT Philippines Midsayap Chapter in coordination with the Santo Niño Parish Pastoral Council and was so successful that it became a yearly event until today.

The festival first gained national recognition when the 1997 Halad champions, Eramis Clan, flew to Manila to compete in the National Finals and bested champions of other major festivals such as the Sinulog Festival of Cebu and the Dinagyang Festival of Iloilo.

The Halad festival re-established its status as a major festival when the 2003 Halad champions, the Dado Alamada National High School, represented Region XII in the national street dancing competition and won the P1 million grand prize in the Aliwan Fiesta held in May 2003 in Manila. Inspired by their back-to-back wins, the group participated again in the Pamaskong Aliwan Festival in December of that same year and also won the grand prize. Both festivals were part of the Visit Philippines 2003 program of the Department of Tourism.

Infrastructure

Transportation

Midsayap is served by almost 2,000 tricycles, either traversing through the main highways or within barangays, which are known locally as "tri-sikad".

Transportation to its barangays and adjacent municipalities are also served by Multicabs, Jeepneys, Dagit-Dagit (single motor) and L300 Vans.

The public bus transport system, maintained by the Mindanao Star Bus Company (formerly Weena Express Bus Company), serves the Davao City—Cotabato City Route which passes through the cities of Kidapawan and Digos.

Public Utility Vans also serve routes to and from the cities of Davao City, Cotabato City, Cagayan de Oro, Tacurong-Isulan, Koronadal and General Santos.

Agencies based in Midsayap

The following are the list of the National Agencies Regional Branch Office on this municipality:
 Philippine Rice Research Institute 
 Agricultural Training Institute 
 Bureau of Plant Industry - National Seed Quality Control Services 
 Malaria Control Services
 National Irrigation Administration Region XII

Health and medical institutions

Midsayap is also very accessible to health facilities thereby a reliable place to go. Medical and diagnostic facilities in the town are:

 A&F Medical Diagnostic Laboratory (Poblacion 5, Midsayap, Cotabato)
 ALAMed Clinical Laboratory (Poblacion 2, Midsayap, Cotabato)
 Anecito T. Pesante Sr. Memorial Hospital Co. (Cor. Pioneer & Tiza St., Poblacion 1, Midsayap, Cotabato)
 Community Health Service Cooperative Hospital (formerly Midsayap Community Doctors Hospital) (Poblacion 8, Midsayap, Cotabato)
 Dr. Amado B. Diaz Provincial Foundation Hospital, Inc. (Roosevelt St., Poblacion 4, Midsayap, Cotabato)
 Dr. Roland P. Dela Cruz Memorial Hospital, Inc. (managed by Midsayap Medical Specialists, Inc.) (Poblacion 8, Midsayap, Cotabato)
 E-Lab Polyclinic and Laboratory (Lapu-Lapu St., Poblacion 3, Midsayap, Cotabato)
 Guinmapang Medical Clinic and Laboratory  (Quezon Ave., Poblacion 6, Midsayap, Cotabato)
 Holy Child Medical City, Inc. (managed by Midsayap United Medical Doctors Hospital, Inc.) (Poblacion 8, Midsayap, Cotabato)
 i-Care Medical Imaging and Diagnostic Center (i-Link CST Bldg., National Highway, Poblacion 8, Midsayap, Cotabato)
 Midsayap Diagnostic Center and Hospital, Inc. (National Highway, Poblacion 8, Midsayap, Cotabato)
 Midsayap Doctors Specialist Hospital, Inc. (Quezon Ave., Poblacion 6, Midsayap, Cotabato)
 Midsayap Neuro Imaging Center, Inc. (Poblacion 8, Midsayap, Cotabato)
 Partners Ultrasound and X-ray Clinic (Madonna Plaza Bldg., Quezon Ave., Poblacion 5, Midsayap, Cotabato)
 PPALMA Cardiovascular Center Inc. (Sol Haus Bldg., Poblacion 6, Midsayap, Cotabato)
 Specialists Clinic & Diagnostic Laboratory (Martin Bldg., Santo Niño St., Poblacion 8, Midsayap, Cotabato)
 Tarongoy Medical Clinic (Quezon Avenue, Midsayap, Cotabato)
 Rural Health Unit (RHU − Midsayap) (Poblacion 5, Midsayap, Cotabato)
 Barangay Health Stations and Birthing Homes across the municipality

Education

It is home to two major college campuses, namely Notre Dame of Midsayap College, the first school in Asia of the Notre Dame educational system, and Southern Christian College of the United Church of Christ in the Philippines as well as a host of privately owned tertiary schools offering business, technical, and allied health courses.

It also has an extensive public and private school system (both elementary and secondary) where basic education is delivered in almost all of its barangays.

Furthermore, Midsayap operates day-care centers in all of its 57 barangays for pre-schoolers to begin their early child education.

Tertiary
 Cotabato Medical Foundation College Inc.
 I-link College of Science and Technology
 Midsayap Community College
 Notre Dame of Midsayap College
 Our Lady of Wisdom Academy
 Polytechnic College of Greater Midsayap Cotabato
 Southern Christian College
 St. Jude College of Science and Technology

Secondary

Public
 Dilangalen National High School**
 Dilangalen National High School Bual Extension
 Agriculture High School
 Agriculture High School (Baliki Annex)
 Arizona High School**
 Elpidio Singco (Kiwanan) High School
 Juan Dillo (Anonang) High School
 Kimagango National High School**
 Malamote National High School
 Malingao High School (Salunayan Annex) 
 Nabalawag High School
 Olandang National High School**
 Patindeguen High School**
 Salunayan High School**
 Salunayan High School (Kapinpilan Annex)
 Salunayan High School (Dabpil Sampulna Olandang Annex)
 Tukuran T. Kendenga High School
 Villarica National High School**
** Schools with Senior High School Curriculum

Private
 I-link College of Science and Technology**
 Katingawan Adventist Academy
 Midsayap Community College**
 Notre Dame of Midsayap College High School**
 Our Lady of Wisdom Academy
 Saint Mary's Academy of Midsayap**
 Southern Christian College High School**
 St. Jude College of Science and Technology**
** Schools with Senior High School Curriculum

Elementary

Public

Midsayap Central:
 Central Katingawan Elementary School
 Midsayap Pilot Elementary School
 Miguel Intes (Katingawan) Elementary School
 Patindeguen Elementary School
 S. Panganiban (Bual) Elementary School
 San Isidro Elementary School

Midsayap North:
 Anonang Elementary School
 Arizona Elementary School
 Elesio (Nalin) Elementary School
 Ilbocean Elementary School
 Kimagango Central Elementary School
 Kimagango Elementary School - Annex
 Lt. Andres Calungsod Elementary School
 Madendog Primary School
 Malamote Elementary School
 Milaya Elementary School
 Upper Bulanan Elementary School
 Upper Labas Elementary School
 Villarica Elementary School

Midsayap South:
 Bitoka Elementary School
 Central Bulanan Elementary School
 Central Glad Elementary School
 Dilangalen Central Elementary School
 Dr. C.H. Deles (Upper Glad) Elementary School
 Elpidio Singco (Kiwanan) Elementary School
 Lower Kiwanan Elementary School
 Sadaan Elementary School
 San Pedro Elementary School
 Santa Cruz Elementary School

Midsayap South-West:
 Agriculture Central Elementary School
 Baliki Elementary School
 Don Miguel Latada (Tumbras) Elementary School
 Flauta (Lower Glad) Elementary School
 Joaquin P. Mostrales (Lagumbingan) Elementary School
 Lt. Jesus Yermo (Bagumba) Elementary School
 Malingao Elementary School
 Nes Elementary School
 Rangeban Elementary School
 Salunayan Elementary School
 Vicente Rapacon Memorial (Palongoguen) Elementary School

Midsayap West:
 D.D. Dilangalen (Tugal) Elementary School
 Dabpil Sampulna (Olandang) Primary School
 Damatulan Elementary School
 Datu Guilem Piang (Upper Olandang) Elementary School 
 Guntong Primary School
 Hadji Ungkakay (Lower Olandang) Elementary School
 Kadigasan Elementary School
 Kadingilan (Pagao Memorial) Primary School
 Kapinpilan Endaila Silongan Central Elementary
 Kudarangan Elementary School
 Lomopog Elementary School
 Macasendeg Elementary School
 Mudseng Elementary School
 Nabalawag Elementary School
 Sambulawan Elementary School

Private
 Cedar School of Arts and Technology
 Great & Mighty Learning Center of Midsayap, Inc.
 Katingawan Seventh-day Adventist Elementary School
 Midsayap Baptist Elementary School
 Midsayap Good Shepherd Learning Center
 Midsayap Montessori Centre
 Notre Dame of Midsayap College - Elementary Training Department
 Our Lady of Wisdom Academy
 Rufino Redoble Sr. Memorial Learning Center, Inc.
 Southern Christian College - Elementary Training Department
 Sunbeam Midsayap Alliance Learning Centre, Inc.

Media

FM Radio Stations
94.3 Power Radio (Hypersonic Broadcasting Center)
95.1 Muews Radio (Sagay Broadcasting Corporation)
96.5 DABIG C Radio (Prime Broadcasting Network)
97.3 T Radio Pigcawayan (ELT ADZ and Communication Services)
100.5 Radyo Bandera (Bandera News Philippines/Fairwaves Broadcasting Network)
103.3 Max FM (Rizal Memorial Colleges Broadcasting Corporation)
104.1 Wow FM (Polytechnic Foundation of Cotabato and Asia)
106.1 Brigada News FM (Brigada Mass Media Corporation)

Cable and Satellite TV
JVL Star Cable
Midsayap Cable and Telecommunication Services, Inc.
Cignal TV

References

External links

 
   Midsayap Profile at the DTI Cities and Municipalities Competitive Index
 [ Philippine Standard Geographic Code]

Municipalities of Cotabato
Populated places on the Rio Grande de Mindanao
Establishments by Philippine executive order